Mohammadabad-e Mokhtar-e Yek (also Romanized as Moḩammadābād-e Mokhtār-e Yek; also known as Moḩammadābād and Moḩammadābād-e Mokhtār) is a village in Azadegan Rural District, in the Central District of Rafsanjan County, Kerman Province, Iran. At the 2006 census, its population was 86, in 21 families.

References 

Populated places in Rafsanjan County